Glutinoglossum australasicum is a species of earth tongue fungus that was described as new to science in 2015. It is found in Australia and New Zealand, where it grows singly or in groups on the ground and in rich humus.

References

External links

Geoglossaceae
Fungi of Australia
Fungi of New Zealand
Fungi described in 2015